JWH-073, a synthetic cannabinoid, is an analgesic chemical from the naphthoylindole family that acts as a partial agonist at both the CB1 and CB2 cannabinoid receptors. It is somewhat selective for the CB1 subtype, with affinity at this subtype approximately 5x the affinity at CB2. The abbreviation JWH stands for John W. Huffman, one of the inventors of the compound.

On 20 April 2009, JWH-073 was claimed by researchers at the University of Freiburg to have been found in a "fertiliser" product called "Forest Humus", along with another synthetic cannabinoid (C8)-CP 47,497. These claims were confirmed in July 2009 when tests of Spice product, seized after the legal ban on JWH-018 had gone into effect in Germany, were shown to contain the unregulated compound JWH-073 instead.

The analgesic effects of cannabinoid ligands, mediated by CB1 receptors are well established in treatment of neuropathic pain, as well as cancer pain and arthritis.

These compounds work by mimicking the body's naturally-produced endocannabinoid hormones such as 2-arachidonoylglycerol and anandamide, which are biologically active and can exacerbate or inhibit nerve signaling.

As the cause is poorly understood in chronic pain states, more research and development must be done before we can realize the therapeutic potential of this class of biologic compounds.

Pharmacology
JWH-073 has been shown to produce behavioral effects very similar to THC in animals.

Its effects are produced by binding and acting as an agonist to the CB1 and CB2 cannabinoid receptors. The CB1 receptor is found in the brain. JWH-073 bind to CB1 with a higher affinity than THC, suggesting that taking more too soon after the initial dose could lead to diminished effects. CB2 is found outside the brain, mostly in the immune system. The binding with CB2 receptors has been shown to be similar between JWH-073 and THC.

A search in the literature yielded no published studies of the effects of JWH-073 in humans, but these studies in animals suggest with high probability that JWH-073 produces effects very similar to those of THC in humans.

Derivatives
The 4'-methyl derivative of JWH-073 has been encountered as an ingredient of synthetic cannabis blends in Germany and several other European countries since 2010. The 4'-methoxy derivative JWH-080 is also known to be a potent cannabinoid agonist and has been banned in some countries, though it is unclear if it has also been used in synthetic cannabis smoking blends.

Legal status

United States 

The US DEA temporarily declared JWH-073 a schedule I controlled substance on 1 March 2011 through 76 FR 11075, and permanently instated the same schedule on 9 July 2012 in the Section 1152 of the Food and Drug Administration Safety and Innovation Act.

Australia

On 8 July 2011 the AUS government banned the sale of JWH-073. JWH-073 is considered a Schedule 9 prohibited substance in Australia under the Poisons Standard (October 2015). A Schedule 9 substance is a substance which may be abused or misused, the manufacture, possession, sale or use of which should be prohibited by law except when required for medical or scientific research, or for analytical, teaching or training purposes with approval of Commonwealth and/or State or Territory Health Authorities.

New Zealand
On 8 May 2014 the New Zealand government banned the sale of JWH-073.

Turkey
On 7 January 2011 the Turkey government banned the sale of JWH-073.

See also 
HU-210
JWH-019
JWH-081
MEPIRAPIM

References 

Designer drugs
JWH cannabinoids
Naphthoylindoles
CB1 receptor agonists
CB2 receptor agonists
Butyl compounds